The 2011 Copa del Rey Juvenil is the 61st staging of the Copa del Rey Juvenil de Fútbol. The competition began on 14 May 2011 and will end on 26 June 2011 with the final.

Calendar

Round of 16

|}

Quarterfinals

|}

Semifinals

|}

Final

Details

See also
2010–11 División de Honor Juvenil de Fútbol

External links
 RFEF site

2011
Juvenil